Al Fashir University is a public university in al-Fashir, the capital city of North Darfur, Sudan.

Foundation
The university was created in 1990 by decree of President Omar Hassan Ahmed Bashir, and was officially opened in February 1991 in premises west of al-Fashir airport and South of the al-Fashir school.

Teaching
There were 11,671 students enrolled in 2011, with 199 faculty members and 243 staff and technical assistants. It is a member of the Association of African Universities.

Research

Conflict analysis
In December 2004 a conference was held to discuss the effect of environmental degradation in causing conflict in Darfur. Faculty and students of the universities of Zalingei, al-Fashir and Nyala presented the findings of their research. They made recommendations that included closer cooperation between the UN and local universities, joint research projects and collaborative workshops.

Human Rights Knowledge Centre
On 28 October 2019, the Minister of Welfare and Social Development, Lena el-Sheikh Mahjoub, and the Deputy Secretary-General of the United Nations, Amina J. Mohammed, opened the Human Rights Knowledge Centre at al-Fashir University, as a cooperative project between the university and the United Nations Development Program (UNDP). The new centre is affiliated with the university's Faculty of Sharia and Law.

Police repression
In October 2010 five students of the university loyal to the Sudan Liberation Movement led by Minni Minawi were arrested by police and were severely beaten before being released on bail. One of them was taken to the hospital for treatment of his injuries. In March 2011 two students were shot dead by police at the university, one from a range of less than one metre. They had been disobeying university authorities and participating in a political rally.

References

 
Fashir
North Darfur
Fashir
1990 establishments in Sudan